Guilsborough Academy is a co-educational academy school in Guilsborough, Northamptonshire, England.

History
The school was founded in September 1958 as Guilsborough Secondary Modern School and was officially opened in May 1959. Many of the buildings on the  site were built at that time or in the 1970s. The most recent addition, opened by Kettering MP Phil Sawford in September 2004, cost £1.3 million, and included a state-of-the-art sixth form centre.  Guilsborough School was a secondary modern school until it became a day school in 1967, serving a large rural catchment. The school became a Technology College specialist school in 1998, before converting to academy status in 2011.

A previous school, Guilsborough Grammar School, an endowed school, had existed on another site in the centre of the village since c.1688.

Achievement
The school's last Ofsted report was undertaken in February 2014, when it was found to be "Good" in all categories. The report stated that "Students achieve well, particularly in English and mathematics, because of the good teaching, care and guidance they receive", and "the proportion of students gaining five A* to C grades, including English and Mathematics, at the end of Year 11, is well above the national average".

GCSE achievement (% 5 A*–C grades)
 2011: 71%
 2012: 74%
 2013: 74%
 2014: 66%
 2015: 96%

Source:

Awards
 Diana Memorial Award, autumn 2002
 Investor in People
 2004 Artsmark Silver
 2007 Artsmark Silver
 Northamptonshire Healthy Schools Silver Award
 Sportsmark
 Student Adam Gravely won the Northamptonshire News Secondary Student of the Year Award 2010

Sport
Student Sam Heygate played for the England Under 16 A rugby union side in season 2007–08.

Ex-student Richard Stearman plays professional football for Sheffield United and has represented England up to Under 21 level.

Feeder schools
 Clipston Endowed Controlled Primary School
 Crick Primary School
 East Haddon Church of England Primary School
 Great Creaton Primary School
 Guilsborough Primary School
 Long Buckby Junior School
 Maidwell Primary School
 Naseby C of E Primary School
 Welford Sibbertoft & Sulby Endowed Primary School
 West Haddon Endowed Church of England Primary School
 Yelvertoft Primary School

References

External links
 
 Guilsborough School Reunited

Secondary schools in West Northamptonshire District
Academies in West Northamptonshire District
Educational institutions established in 1958
1958 establishments in England